Samuel or Sam Murray may also refer to:

People 
Sam Murray (flute maker), Irish flute maker
Sam Murray (footballer) (born 1997), Australian footballer
Sam Murray (tennis) (born 1987), British tennis player
Samuel Murray (sculptor) (1869–1941), American sculptor
Kinetic 9 (born Samuel Craig Murray), American hip-hop musician
Samuel J. Murray (1851–1915), American inventor
Sam Coghlan Murray (born 1992), Irish rugby union player
Samuel Murray (racquetball), Canadian racquetball player

Fiction 
Sam Murray, character played by Kevin McDonald in the 2010 Canadian comedy miniseries The Kids in the Hall: Death Comes to Town
Sam Murray, character played by Heather Peace in the 2010 British drama series Lip Service (TV series)

See also
Murray (disambiguation)